Muirchertach An Cullach Ua Dubhda (died 1096) was King of Ui Fiachrach Muaidhe.

Annalistic references

 1096. Muircheartach, i.e. the Boar, O'Dubhda, lord of the Ui-Amhalghadha, was slain by his own tribe.

External links

 http://www.ucc.ie/celt/published/T100005B/

References

 The History of Mayo, Hubert T. Knox, p. 379, 1908.

People from County Sligo
Monarchs from County Mayo
11th-century Irish monarchs